Bertrand Grospellier (born 8 February 1981 in Melun), also known as ElkY , is a French poker player and former StarCraft: Brood War and Warcraft III esports player. He has won a World Poker Tour (WPT), a World Series of Poker (WSOP) bracelet and a European Poker Tour (EPT) title, giving him the Triple Crown. He is a partypoker Pro and he currently resides in Prague, Czech Republic. ElkY is ranked #77 on the Global Poker Index (info from 8 July 2014). In November 2015 ElkY returned to the esports scene by joining Team Liquid as a Hearthstone player.

StarCraft and WarCraft III
ElkY was one of the top ranked StarCraft players in the world, having placed second in the World Cyber Games in 2001 and continuing his career in South Korea in the years subsequent including a fourth-place finish in an Ongamenet Starleague. By 2002, he picked up the newly released WarCraft III: Reign of Chaos and garnered success by finishing second in the televised Ongamenet WarCraft Retail League before retiring.

Accomplishments
3rd - StarCraft: Brood War, KBK Jeju, 2001 (Seoul, South Korea)
2nd - StarCraft: Brood War, World Cyber Games 2001 (Seoul, South Korea)
4th - StarCraft: Brood War, World Cyber Games 2002 (Daejeon, South Korea)
4th - StarCraft: Brood War, SKY 2 Ongamenet Starleague, 2002 (Seoul, South Korea)
2nd - WarCraft III: Reign of Chaos, Ongamenet WarCraft Retail League, 2002 (Seoul, South Korea)
1st - StarCraft: Brood War, Euro Cyber Games 2003 (Paris, France)
Round 8 - StarCraft: Brood War, World Cyber Games 2003 (Seoul, South Korea)
Round 16 - StarCraft: Brood War, World Cyber Games 2004 (San Francisco, California, United States)

Poker career
He has turned his attention to professional poker the last few years. ElkY was a member of Team PokerStars. He was the first person ever to reach "Supernova" and "Supernova Elite" statuses on PokerStars - having earned 100,000 and 1,000,000 player points in 2 weeks, and  months, respectively.

Accomplishments
He set the Guinness World Record for most Single Table Sit & Goes played in one hour for a total of 62 at a $6.50 buy in with a profit of $23.60.
As of February 2018, his total live tournament winnings exceed $13,500,000.

European Poker Tour
On Saturday, 20 January 2007, he finished second in the Copenhagen event on the European Poker Tour for 309,000 Euros.
In January 2008, ElkY finished in 1st place winning $2,000,000 at the European Poker Tour's (EPT) PokerStars Caribbean Poker Adventure.
A year later, while being knocked out of the main event of the PokerStars Caribbean Poker Adventure on day 1, ElkY went on to take home the EPT5 $25,000 buy-in "High Roller" side event for $433,500.

World Poker Tour
In October 2008, ElkY added to his tournament haul by winning the World Poker Tour's Festa al Lago tournament, claiming a $1.4 million first prize. The win marked ElkY's first-ever cash on the WPT. He also became just the third person, along with Roland De Wolfe and Gavin Griffin, to win a title on both the WPT and EPT. As a result of his success on the seventh season of the World Poker Tour, ElkY was awarded the distinction of "WPT Player of the Year."

World Championship of Online Poker
ElkY was disqualified from event 29 in the 2008 World Championship of Online Poker (WCOOP) for agreeing to go all-in blind with another player. This violated the tournament rule which states "Poker is an individual (not a team) game. Any action or chat intended to help another player is unethical and is prohibited." His winnings were forfeited and other places were moved up in the standings to replace his finish. Two other players (Annette_15 and charder30) had also violated the same rule earlier.

On 18 September 2009, ElkY won his first WCOOP bracelet in event 38. He added a second bracelet only three days later in Event 43 by besting a field of 9,220 entrants. His winnings for both events totaled nearly $500,000.

Spring Championship of Online Poker Titles

World Series of Poker
ElkY won his first WSOP bracelet in the '2011 Seven Card Stud Championship', overcoming a field of 126 to collect $331,639 in prize money. This win made ElkY only the fourth player to win a WPT, EPT and WSOP title.

ElkY won his second bracelet in the 2019 WSOPE winning the $550 Colossus No limit holdem event.

An "E" following a year denotes bracelet(s) won at the World Series of Poker Europe

Charity
Today, ElkY is a member of the "Champions for Peace" club, a group of 54 famous elite athletes committed to serving peace in the world through sport, created by Peace and Sport, a Monaco-based international organization.

Hearthstone
In November 2015, Elky returned to the esports scene by joining Team Liquid as a Hearthstone player.

References

External links
Team PokerStars profile 
Blonde Poker interview
Global Gaming League interview
Bertrand "ElkY" Grospellier Profile
Bertrand "ElkY" Grospellier Interview

Sportspeople from Melun
1981 births
Living people
French esports players
French poker players
StarCraft players
Warcraft III players
Hearthstone players
European Poker Tour winners
World Poker Tour winners
World Series of Poker bracelet winners